Boo Junfeng (Chinese: 巫俊锋; pinyin: wū jùn fēng; born 4 December 1983) is a Singaporean filmmaker. Boo's films, Sandcastle (2010) and Apprentice (2016) have been screen at the Cannes Film Festival, beginning with his debut, Sandcastle, which was an International Critics' Week nominee.

Background
Boo is an ethnic Hokkien. He graduated from the School of Film & Media Studies at Ngee Ann Polytechnic in 2003, and from the Puttnam School of Film, LASALLE College of the Arts, in 2009, where he was accorded the McNally Award for Excellence in the Arts – the valedictorian honour of the college.

His films, many of which show a preoccupation with places and historical and personal memory, have won prizes and acclaim and have been shown in film festivals around the world. Boo's debut feature film Sandcastle (2010) was the first Singaporean film to be invited to the International Critics' Week at Cannes Film Festival.  Notable short films include Un Retrato De Familia (2004), Katong Fugue (2007), Keluar Baris (2008) and Tanjong Rhu (2009).

In 2013, Boo won the President’s Young Talents Credit Suisse Artist Commissioning Award for a video art piece, Mirror. Later that year, he participated at the Singapore Biennale with Happy and Free, a video installation that depicted a Singapore that remained a part of Malaysia in 2013 and was celebrating the 50th anniversary of the territories' merger. Boo's short film, "Parting" was released as part of the omnibus titled 7 Letters (2015) to commemorate Singapore's 50th year of independence.

Boo's second feature film Apprentice (2016) was selected at the Un Certain Regard section of the 2016 Cannes Film Festival. Executive produced by filmmaker Eric Khoo, the film is a psychological drama about a young Malay correctional officer who is transferred to Singapore's top prison where he befriends its soon-to-retire chief executioner.  He also revealed in an interview that he is personally against the death penalty in Singapore.

In 2016, Boo received the Rising Director award at the 21st Busan International Film Festival's Asia Star Awards 2016.

Boo was selected as the creative director of the Singapore National Day Parade in 2018 and 2021.

Filmography 
 Plague (part of 15 Shorts; 2018)
 Apprentice (2016)
 7 Letters (omnibus - segment "Parting"; 2015)
 Sandcastle (2010)
 Tanjong Rhu (aka The Casuarina Cove) (short; 2009)
 Keluar Baris / Homecoming (short; 2008)
 Bedok Jetty (short; 2008)
 Lucky 7 (omnibus - segment 3; 2007)
 Katong Fugue (short; 2007)
 The Changi Murals (short; 2006)
 Guo Ke / Stranger (short; 2004)
 Un Retrato De Familia / A Family Portrait (short; 2004)

 Awards 
2010 1st Hanoi International Film Festival Best Feature Film and Best Director awards (Sandcastle)
2016 4th BIFF with Marie Claire Asia Star Awards: Rising Director (Apprentice'')

References

External links 
 
 

1983 births
Living people
Singaporean artists
Singaporean film directors
Singaporean people of Hokkien descent
Singaporean screenwriters
LASALLE College of the Arts alumni